This article lists the main modern pentathlon events and their results for 2000.

2000 Summer Olympics (UIPM)
 September 30 & October 1: Modern pentathlon at the 2000 Summer Olympics in  Sydney at The Dome and Exhibition Complex, the Sydney International Aquatic Centre, and the Sydney Baseball Stadium
 Men:   Dmitri Svatkovskiy;   Gábor Balogh;   Pavel Dovgal
 Women:   Steph Cook;   Emily deRiel;   Kate Allenby

Other international modern pentathlon events
 July 23: 2000 CISM Regional Competition in  Prague
 Winner:  Andrejus Zadneprovskis

World modern pentathlon events
 Note: The men's results from the 2000 World Junior MP Championships page were inconclusive.
 June 12 & 13: 2000 World Modern Pentathlon Championships in  Pesaro
 Individual winners:  Andrejus Zadneprovskis (m) /  Pernille Svarre (f)
 August 21: 2000 World Junior Modern Pentathlon Championships in  Sofia
 Women's Junior Individual winner:  Tatiana Mouratova

Continental modern pentathlon events
 Note 1: There was no men's results in the UIPM's 2000 Oceania MP championships page.
 Note 2: There was no men's results in the UIPM's 2000 Asian MP championships page.
 Note 3: There were discrepancies, in terms about which city hosted the main UIPM's 2000 European Modern Pentathlon Championships event.
 Note 4: There was no men's results in the UIPM's 2000 Pan American MP championships page.
 January 29: 2000 Oceania Modern Pentathlon Championships in  Sydney
 Women's Individual winner:  Cecile Walter
 April 23: 2000 Asian Modern Pentathlon Championships in  Osaka
 Women's Individual winner:  WANG Jinglin
 May 24: 2000 South American Modern Pentathlon Championships in  Santiago
 Men's Individual winner:  Andrés García
 Men's Team Relay winners:  (Daniel Santos, Wagner Romao, & Eduardo Carvalho)
 July 3: 2000 European Modern Pentathlon Championships (#1) in  Székesfehérvár
 Individual winners:  Imre Tiidemann (m) /  Zsuzsanna Vörös (f)
 July 14: 2000 European Modern Pentathlon Championships (#2) in  Plzeň
 Women's Individual winner:  Tatiana Gorliak
 November 3 & 4: 2000 Pan American Modern Pentathlon Championships in  Havana
 Women's Individual winner:  Miranda Dominguez

2000 Modern Pentathlon World Cup
 Note 1: There were no women's results for the MPWC #1 event.
 Note 2: There were no women's results for the MPWC #2 event.
 March 17 & 18: MPWC #1 in  San Antonio
 Men's Individual winner:  Vakhtang Iagorashvili
 Team Relay winners:  Andrei Kourakine (m) /  Clarisse Menezes (f; default)
 April 7 & 8: MPWC #2 in  Seoul
 Winner:  Vadym Tkachuk
 April 27: MPWC #3 in  Budapest
 Both events had results that were inconclusive.
 May 11: MPWC #4 in  Darmstadt
 Both events had results that were inconclusive.
 October 14 & 15: MPWC #5 (final) in  Aix-en-Provence
 Individual winners:  Vadym Tkachuk (m) /  Caroline Delemer (f)

References

External links
 Union Internationale de Pentathlon Moderne Website (UIPM)

 
Modern pentathlon
2000 in sports